Greatest Hits is the fourth compilation album by American pop rock duo Sonny & Cher, released in 1974 by MCA Records.

Album information
Greatest Hits was released in 1974 and reached #146 on the Billboard album charts.

Greatest Hits contains Sonny and Cher's hit songs from their two studio albums and their live albums released by Kapp/MCA Records. It contained "All I Ever Need Is You", "A Cowboy's Work Is Never Done" and the single edit of "Mama Was A Rock And Roll Singer ..." plus some live songs from the album Sonny & Cher Live.

The original Greatest Hits compilation album in its entirety remains unreleased on compact disc. It was partially released in the 1990 compilation All I Ever Need Is You.

Track listing

Side A
"All I Ever Need is You" (Holiday, Reeves) - 2:38
"When You Say Love" (Steve Carmen, Jerry Foster, Bill Rice) - 2:26
"You Better Sit Down Kids" (S. Bono) - 3:16
"Crystal Clear/Muddy Waters" (Laurie) - 2:39
"I Got You Babe" (Live) (S. Bono) - 3:14

Side B
"A Cowboy's Work is Never Done" (S. Bono) - 3:14
"United We Stand" (Tony Hiller, Peter Simons) - 2:35
"The Beat Goes On" (Live) (S. Bono) - 2:18
"What Now My Love" (Live) (Carl Sigman, Gilbert Bécaud, Pierre Delanoë) - 2:48
"Mama Was a Rock and Roll Singer Papa Used to Write All Her Songs" (Single Edit) (S. Bono) - 3:43

Charts

Credits

Personnel
Main vocals: Cher
Main vocals: Sonny Bono

Production
Sonny Bono: Producer

References

1974 greatest hits albums
Sonny & Cher albums
Albums produced by Snuff Garrett
Albums produced by Sonny Bono
MCA Records compilation albums